This  list of protected areas in Aarhus Municipality lists protected areas in Aarhus Municipality, Denmark. Three protections in the municipality are shared with adjacent Skanderborg Municipality.

Aarhus Municipality holds a total of four Natura2000 in-land protections of international importance. There is also a sea-area Natura2000 protection in the Bay of Aarhus at the Mejlflak reef.

Of the other protections within the municipality, most of the older ones are grounded in attempts at protecting scenic landscape values or securing public access, while more recent protections are mostly based in protecting biodiversity and threatened habitats.

List

See also

References

Aarhus Municipality
Protected areas of Denmark by municipality